Peter Leopold von Schrenck (1826 – 8 January 1894) was a Russian zoologist, geographer and ethnographer.

Biography
He received his doctorate from the Imperial University of Dorpat, and then studied natural science in Berlin and Königsberg. He joined the crew of the Aurora in the circumnavigation of the world.

In 1853 Schrenck was sent by the St Petersburg Academy of Sciences to explore the Amurland on board the schooner Vostok. He reached the mouth of the Amur in September 1854 with the botanist Carl Maximowicz. In February 1855 he visited Sakhalin and then explored the Amur in the spring and summer. In 1856 he returned overland to Europe, via Lake Baykal. He published his findings in his Reisen und Forschungen im Amur-Lande (1860). He was awarded the Konstantin medal by the Russian Geographical Society.

In later years Schrenck turned his attention to the study of the native peoples of Russia. On 10 November, 1879 he was appointed director of the Peter the Great Museum of Anthropology and Ethnography in St Petersburg.

A number of animals are named after Schrenck, including the following species.
 Schrenck's limpet, Notoacmea schrenckii
 Amur sturgeon, Acipenser shrenckii
 Manchurian black water snake, Elaphe schrenckii 
 Schrenck's bittern, Ixobrychus eurhythmus
 A butterfly, Apatura schrenckii.

See also
 List of Baltic German scientists

References

Sources
Mearns and Mearns - Biographies for Birdwatchers 
Kunstkamera

1826 births
1894 deaths
People from Sumy Oblast
People from Sumsky Uyezd
Baltic-German people
19th-century German zoologists
Explorers from the Russian Empire
Geographers from the Russian Empire
German geographers
Russian anthropologists
German anthropologists
University of Tartu alumni
Humboldt University of Berlin alumni
University of Königsberg alumni
Full members of the Saint Petersburg Academy of Sciences